The Langtons is an area of Harborough, Leicestershire, England comprising the following villages:
Church Langton
East Langton
Thorpe Langton
Tur Langton
West Langton

Villages in Leicestershire
Geography of Leicestershire
Harborough District